Jules Louis Dupré (April 5, 1811 – October 6, 1889) was a French painter, one of the chief members of the Barbizon school of landscape painters. If Corot stands for the lyric and Rousseau for the epic aspect of the poetry of nature, Dupré is the exponent of its tragic and dramatic aspects.

Biography
Dupré was born in Nantes. He exhibited first at the Salon in 1831, and three years later was awarded a second-class medal. In the same year, he came to England where he was impressed by the genius of Constable. From then on, he learned how to express movement in nature; and the districts around Southampton and Plymouth, with their wide, unbroken expanses of water, sky and ground, gave him good opportunities for studying the tempestuous motion of storm-clouds and the movement of foliage driven by the wind. He was named an Officer of the French Légion d'honneur in 1848. His daughter Therese-Marthe-Francoise also became a painter.

Dupré's colour is sonorous and resonant. He showed preference for using dramatic sunset effects and stormy skies and seas as the subjects of his paintings. Late in life he changed his style and gained appreciably in largeness of handling and arrived at greater simplicity in his colour harmonies. Among his chief works are the Morning and Evening at the Louvre, and the early Crossing the Bridge in the Wallace Collection.

Selected paintings

References

External links

Environs de Plymouth - Rehs Galleries' biography on Jules Dupré and an image of his early painting Environs de Plymouth.

Degas: The Artist's Mind, exhibition catalog from The Metropolitan Museum of Art fully available online as PDF, which contains material on Jules Dupré (see index)

1812 births
1889 deaths
19th-century French painters
French male painters
Landscape artists
Officiers of the Légion d'honneur
19th-century French male artists